Marble Bar is an historic bar in Sydney, Australia. Originally constructed in the George Adams-owned O'Brien Hotel in 1893, it was dismantled in 1969, then moved and rebuilt in the subterranean level of the Hilton Sydney, on George Street, in 1973. It is now a heritage-listed building.

The bar was designed by Varney Parkes. Its features include plate-glass mirrors, mosaic floors, cedar timbers, a domed roof, stained-glass windows and marble walls and pilasters. Fourteen paintings by Julian Ashton are hung throughout. The only differences to the original bar is the lack of natural light, and the location of the paintings is different.

Popular culture 
The bar appears on the front cover of Cold Chisel's 1979 album Breakfast at Sweethearts.

References 

Pubs in Sydney

External links 

 

New South Wales State Heritage Register sites located in the Sydney central business district
Rebuilt buildings and structures in Australia
1893 establishments in Australia
1973 establishments in Australia
Buildings and structures completed in 1893
Buildings and structures completed in 1973